Eschbach is a small river of Hesse, Germany. It is a left tributary of the Usa near Usingen.

See also
List of rivers of Hesse

Rivers of Hesse
Rivers of the Taunus
Rivers of Germany